Manasu is a 2000 Tamil language romantic drama film directed by Abdul Rahman. The film stars newcomer Sakthi and Oviya, with Sanjeev Kumar, S. Suryakiran, Vijayakumar, Jayachitra, Senthil, Kovai Sarala, Jeeva and Mounika playing supporting roles. It was released on 15 December 2000.

Plot

Sanjeev (Sakthi) is a studious college student while the carefree Vicky (Sanjeev Kumar) spends his time causing trouble in college. During the college exhibition, Sanjeev accidentally hurts Nandhini (Oviya) on her hand and he immediately apologizes for his mistake. An angry Vicky then gets into a fight with Sanjeev but Sanjeev beats him and his friends up. Nandhini's mother Pankajam (Jayachitra) becomes overprotective and she suspects her daughter of being in love with their neighbour Sanjeev. Being sick of this situation, one day, an impulsive Nandhini kisses Sanjeev in front of her mother Pankajam. The two eventually fall in love with each other. When her father (Vijayakumar), an ambassador, returns home from abroad, he tries to convince Nandhini to forget her lover but Nandhini wants to marry Sanjeev at all means. Nandhini's father then learns that Sanjeev killed his mother and tells it to his daughter. Meanwhile, at a college excursion, Vicky and his friends try to rape their collegemate Juli (Jeeva) but Sanjeev comes to her rescue and Nandhini spits on Vicky's face. Vicky and his friends are consequently expelled from college, and Vicky swears to take revenge on the lovers.

Thereafter, Nandhini compels Sanjeev to reveal the reason for killing his mother. Many years ago, Sanjeev lived with his parents who were poor labourers. After the death of his father, Lakshmi (Mounika) became vulnerable and her boss tried to woo her and one night, he entered her house and tried to rape. The young Sanjeev had no other choice than to kill his mother to save her dignity and he was sent to jail for his crime. He was then adopted by a wealthy foreigner who gave him everything except affection. Sanjeev tells Nandhini that she is the first person who showed him affection and Nandhini in tears responds that he did the right thing. Nandhini's parents decided to take their daughter with them to go abroad but they change their mind when they read her private diary and they want her to be happy. In the meantime, Nandhini meets Sanjeev at the beach to talk about it and vengeful Vicky comes to the place with his friends. During the fight, Sanjeev manages to beat them up and the couple tries to run away. Vicky then shoots Sanjeev in the legs and he tries to rape Nandhini in front of Sanjeev but Vicky leaves the gun behind him. Nandhini escapes from them and hugs a wounded Sanjeev. When Sanjeev aims the gun at them, they laugh because the gun had only one bullet left. To save his lover's virginity, Sakthi pressed Nandhini tightly in his arms and shoots in her back thus the lovers died.

Cast

Gandhi Mohan(aka) Sakthi as Sanjeev
Oviya as Nandhini
Sanjeev Kumar as Vicky (Vikram)
S. Suryakiran
Vijayakumar as Nandhini's father
Jayachitra as Pankajam, Nandhini's mother
Senthil as Dhamodharan
Kovai Sarala as Santha
Jeeva as Juli
Mounika as Lakshmi, Sanjeev's mother
Typist Gopu
Chaplin Balu
Premi as Maid
Sai Kiruba
Madasamy
Haribabu
Karna
Master Santhosh
Mounica
Jageera
Gundu Kalyanam
Gaja

Production
The cinematographer Abdul Rahman, who worked in films like Kizhakku Vasal (1990), Idhayam (1991) and Ponnumani (1993),  made his directorial debut with Manasu under the banner of Sheela Cine Arts. Sakthi, who acted in NDFC's Karuvelam Pookkal (1996), was chosen to play the hero while Oviya, who acted in Sathi Sanam (1997), was selected to play the heroine. Deva composed the music, the Abdul Rahman also took care of camera work and DSR Subash was the film editor. The climax of the film was shot at Muttom beach.

Soundtrack

The film score and the soundtrack were composed by Deva. The soundtrack, released in 2000, features 5 tracks.

Reception
Malathi Rangarajan of The Hindu said, "As a young man of very few words who is always serious and pensive, Shakti makes a mark. The heroine Oviya could have been a little more expressive [..] The dialogue at every point, seems to have been written after giving a lot of thought to the questions that would arise in the viewer's minds. The arguments and counters of the characters bear evidence to this fact". A critic from the portal TamilBeat.com wrote of Abdul Rehman's work "he has not allowed the camera to overpower his narration goes to his credit, but Rehman chooses the same old college campus romance with its clichéd scenes as his backdrop".

References

2000 films
2000s Tamil-language films
Indian romantic drama films
Films scored by Deva (composer)
2000 romantic drama films